SS Lydia was a passenger ferry that was built in Scotland in 1890 for the London and South Western Railway. From 1920 onward she passed through several owners. In 1923 she was renamed Ierax and registered in Greece. She was scrapped in 1933.

Building and registration
Lydia was the second of the trio to be built. She was launched on 16 July 1890 and made her sea trials on the River Clyde on 12 September 1890.

She was built with accommodation for 170 first class passengers, 70 second class and numerous steerage passengers.

Lydia had twin screws, each powered by a three-cylinder triple expansion steam engine.

The LSWR registered Lydia at Southampton. Her United Kingdom official number was 97217 and her code letters were LNTM.

Career
In 1915 a submarine attacked Lydia, but the torpedo passed 50 yards from the ship.

In 1920 the LSWR sold Lydia. In 1923 Coast Lines bought her and re-registered her in Liverpool. Coast Lines planned to operate her between Dublin and Preston, Lancashire, but then sold her that same year to Navigation a Vapeur Ionienne, who renamed her Ierax and registered her in Argostoli in Greece. Her code letters were changed to JFGT. In 1929 she passed to Hellenic Coast Lines, who registered her in Piraeus. She was scrapped in 1933.

References

1890 ships
Steamships of the United Kingdom
Ships built on the River Clyde
Ships of the London and South Western Railway
Steamships of Greece